Burkinabé Socialist Party (in French: Party Socialiste Burkinabé) was a political party in Burkina Faso. The PSB split from the PAI in the early 1990s. Its leader was Ouindélassida François Ouédraogo.

At the legislative elections in 1992, the PSB won 1.2% of the popular vote and 1 out of 111 seats. In 1997, it won 1.8% of the vote and one seat.

In May 2001, it merged with the Party for Democracy and Progress.

Defunct political parties in Burkina Faso
Socialist parties in Burkina Faso